Paul Anthony Schwegler, (May 22, 1907 – December 7, 1980) was born to immigrant parents from Germany and Russian Poland, and was an American football tackle.  His college football experience helped to launch an acting career in Hollywood during the 1930s, first paying minor parts in football films and later in other genres, such as the drama film 365 Nights in Hollywood (1934). In 1936, Schwegler accompanied Hollywood director Tay Garnett on a work voyage from Los Angeles across the Pacific, through Asia, and to Europe.  PA two-time All-American tackle,   He was elected to the College Football Hall of Fame in 1967.

References

External links

1907 births
1980 deaths
People from Raymond, Washington
American football tackles
Washington Huskies football players
College Football Hall of Fame inductees
American male film actors
20th-century American male actors